In Sharia (Islamic Law) niṣāb (نِصاب) is the minimum amount that a Muslim must have before being obliged to give zakat. Zakat is determined based on the amount of wealth acquired; the greater one's assets, the greater the zakat value. Unlike income tax in secular states niṣāb is not subject to special exemptions.

Each category of zakatable valuables has its own niṣāb. The niṣāb of gold is 20 dinārs and the nisab of silver is 200 dirhams for silver based on the original 1 to 10 exchange rate.  The niṣāb of crops is five wasaq, and the nisab of livestock varies depending on the type of animal.

Niṣāb of Gold and Silver
The value of the niṣāb is calculated in dinār coins and dirḥam coins. The dinār is a gold coin weighing one mithqal (4.25 grams) and the dirḥam is a silver coin weighing 0.7 mithqal (2.975 grams). The relation between 20 dinārs and 200 dirḥams which is part of the definition of niṣāb reflects the contemporary exchange value between the dinār and the dirḥam of 1 to 10 in the early days of Islam. In later times the exchange rate between the two Sharia coins changed according to market values, and so exchange rates of 1 to 11 and 1 to 12 are seen in early fiqh literature. This exchange rate has varied even more in the last few centuries. The shift in exchange rate meant that in later times 20 dinārs became more expensive in market value than 200 dirḥams. Despite this the definition of niṣāb has not been altered throughout Islamic history, and therefore a choice is created between the value of 20 dinārs and the value of 200 dirḥams. Both values are accepted in Shariah, and so one can choose to pay the value of either of them.

The niṣāb is applicable to the cumulative stock of dinārs, dirḥam and any other zakatable valuables, such as merchandise that has been in store for at least one year. As long as the total value of the zakatable valuables exceeds the value of the niṣāb, zakat must be paid.

Some modern scholars have accepted that since dinārs and dirhams are no longer readily available the best solution is to calculate the niṣāb using a mithqal of pure gold as a reference. Although this is not an exact calculation it is considered a valid approximation given current circumstances.

Niṣāb of Currency
The dominant opinion among contemporary Muslim jurists is that Zakat extends to modern exchangeable currencies, this imposed unprecedented challenge to the calculation of nisab. To overcome this problem, most contemporary jurists follow one of two approaches:

 Use gold as an evaluation reference. This is rationalized by the fact that gold is the origin of modern currency, and is considered more precious than silver.  
 Use whichever satisfies best the interests of the poor.

Niṣāb for Livestock
The niṣāb for the three zakatable livestock is as follows:

 Camels: five animals
 Cows: thirty animals
 Goats and Sheep: forty animals

The Hanafi school is unique in extending zakat to horses under certain conditions. When it is applicable, there is no nisab and one mithqal is to be paid for each horse. 

An individual who owns number of animals less than the above nisab is not obliged to pay Zakat. Also, the nisab of each animals is not be mixed with another. For example, having twenty cows and thirty goats would be considered below the nisab as it does not reach the threshold of 30-cows and 40-goats.

Niṣāb for Agricultural Products 
There is consensus among Muslim Jurists that Zakat is applicable to dates, grapes, wheat and barley. According to the majority opinion, zakat is also applicable to staples which could be stored like: corn, rice, lentils, dry peas and dry beans, while it is not applicable to fruits and vegetables like cucumbers, zucchini, onions, oranges and apricots. The Hanafi school applies Zakat on all agricultural produce according to the opinion of Imam Abu Hanfia. According to Imam Abu Yusuf and Muhamad bin Al Hasan, it only applies to plants which produce can last (through storage) for a year.  

When zakat applies to a plant, the nisab is five Wasaq. Each wasaq is valued as sixty Sa'''. Contemporary equivalency of Sa' according to one approximation is 2.03 liters. Therefore, the total nisab for agricultural produce is 609.84 kg.

 One year rule 
In order to be liable for zakat a Muslim must possess wealth in excess of the niṣāb level for one lunar year (354 days). This year begins on the date the wealth is obtained; so long as the assets are in its owner's possession at the beginning and end of the lunar year the zakat tax is applicable.  In many modern societies niṣāb is considered equivalent to a governmentally determined poverty threshold.''

References 

Islamic jurisprudence
Islamic economic jurisprudence
Islamic terminology
Arabic words and phrases in Sharia
Sharia legal terminology